Sutamla (1648–1663) Jayadhwaj Singha was the 20th king of the Ahom kingdom.  During his reign the Mughal viceroy at Bengal Mir Jumla II invaded and occupied his capital Garhgaon as a result of which he had to retreat to the Namrup area, and because of this flight he is also known as the Bhagania Roja in the Buranjis. In the days of Jayadhwaj Singha Auniati Satra and Dakhinpat Satra was established. He formally accepted the initiation of Niranjan Bapu and settled him as the as Satradhikar (head of Vaisnava religious institution) in the Auniati Satra. He even exempted disciples of satra from personal labour to the state.

Accession
Sutamla became the king after his father, the erstwhile king Sutingphaa, was deposed by the Burhagohain.

Mir Jumla's invasion

After the Mughal emperor Shah Jahan fell sick in 1658, the vassal ruler of Koch Bihar, Pran Narayan, threw off the Mughal yoke and took possession of Kamrup and Hajo.  The Ahoms, taking advantage of the confusion, pushed west and took control of the region up to the Sankosh river.  Mir Jumla II, Aurangzeb's general who pursued Prince Shuja to the Arakan, was made the governor of Bengal.  Very soon he repossessed Koch Bihar and began his campaign against the Ahom kingdom on January 4, 1662.  The Ahoms took a stand at the Jogighopa fort at the Manas river.  Mir Jumla overran Jogighopa, Guwahati, Simlagarh, Salagarh and finally Sutamla's capital Garhgaon on March 17, which the Ahom king had abandoned for Namrup.

Early onset of monsoon that year made it difficult for Mir Jumla to transfer the voluminous booty that fell into his hands following his capture of Garhgaon.  Atan Burhagohain, who was left behind as rearguard, began harassing the Mughal with guerrilla tactics, and Mir Jumla had to fall back to Garhgaon and Mathurapur, with the Ahoms taking back possession of the rest of the kingdom.  Sutamla came down from Namrup and camped at Solaguri. After that Swargadeo Jayadhwaj Singha had to sign Treaty of Ghilajharighat. According to this treaty Swargadeo Jayadhwaj Singha sent his daughter Ramani Gabharu to the Mughal empire.

Notes

References

 

1648 births 
1663 deaths

Ahom kingdom
Ahom kings